The Rolls-Royce Trent 7000 is a high-bypass turbofan engine produced by Rolls-Royce, an iteration of the Trent family powering exclusively the Airbus A330neo.

Announced on 14 July 2014, it first ran on 27 November 2015.
It made its first flight on 19 October 2017 aboard on the A330neo.
It received its EASA type certification on 20 July 2018 as a Trent 1000 variant.
It was first delivered on 26 November,
and was cleared for ETOPS 330 by 20 December.

Compared to the A330's Trent 700, the  engine doubles the bypass ratio to 10:1 and halves emitted noise. Pressure ratio is increased to 50:1, and it has a  fan and a bleed air system.
Fuel consumption is improved by 11%.

Development 

Announced on 14 July 2014 at the Farnborough Airshow, the Trent 7000 is the exclusive engine for the Airbus A330neo, succeeding the Trent 700 used for the Airbus A330.
It first ran on 27 November 2015 on a test bed in Derby.
Although the first two test engines were made in Derby, further test engines and production Trent 7000 is assembled in the Rolls-Royce Singapore facility.

In 2015 Rolls experienced development problems with the Trent 1000 TEN, and had to involve extra resources to support the on-time March 2017 787-10 maiden flight but it led to delaying the Trent 7000.
The first pair of engines were shipped to Airbus in June 2017.
It made its first flight on 19 October 2017 aboard its A330neo application, directly after ground testing which included altitude, icing, cross-wind, noise and cyclic testing in USA, and endurance, operability and functional performance testing in UK.

As it is based on the Trent 1000, it was feared that it could share its durability problems and that could deter buyers. However, Rolls-Royce's CEO Warren East said the 7000 was not affected by the Trent 1000 issues.

It received its EASA type certification on 20 July 2018.
It is certified as a Trent 1000 variant.
This was delayed from the initially planned first quarter of 2017.
At the time, ETOPS testing was halfway through as 3,000 engine cycles are planned, to be completed by early August.
The engine was then planned to be disassembled, examined and reported by the end of September, for an ETOPS certification in time for the year-end introduction.

By August 2018, quantity production was challenging and in October Rolls-Royce expected 500 large engines deliveries in 2018, down from 550.
Rolls confirmed 10 deliveries by the end of October, below the 30 needed for 15 A330neos deliveries by year-end.
The A330-900 was initially cleared for 180 min ETOPS with a limitation of 500 engine cycles for the first delivery to TAP Portugal
on 26 November.
Full ETOPS required an EASA approval plan with a 3,000 cycles validation test plus three simulated diversions followed by disassembly and examination before the end of December.
ETOPS 330 was secured by 20 December.

In 2019, Rolls-Royce delivered 106 Trent 7000s, up from eight in 2018, while it achieved a 99.9% dispatch reliability.

Design 

Its architecture comes from the latest version of the Trent 1000, the TEN, using the A330's Trent 700 experience and technology from the Trent XWB.
The  engine doubles the bypass ratio and halves emitted noise compared to the Trent 700.
Maximum pressure ratio is increased to 50:1 from 36:1 and it has a bleed air system for environmental control and wing anti-icing.

This doubles the bypass ratio from 5 to 10. It has the highest bypass ratio of any Trent engine.
The fan has 20 blades.

The overall pressure ratio increases thanks to Trent XWB core compressor technology, improving thermal efficiency. This is associated with a 200-Kelvin increase in internal temperatures; Thermally-coated high-pressure turbine blades are used instead of the more expensive ceramic matrix composites, which are used in the next Rolls-Royce engine generation, Ultrafan. The larger fan and higher bypass ratio require two more stages in the low-pressure turbine; the engine is heavier.
The Trent 700 weighs : while the Trent 7000 weighs ,  more.

Despite the additional weight and the extra drag resulting from the wider diameter, Rolls-Royce reported fuel consumption would improve by 11%.
Since bleed air is used instead of electrical power generation (as in the 787's Trent 1000), the IP accessory drive is less loaded and enables the high-pressure compressor to maintain stability at low power settings, improving low-speed fuel consumption for short-haul operations.
The engine features active turbine clearance control providing the optimal level of cooling air for different phases of flight.

Rolls-Royce reports the engine is 10 dB quieter than the Trent 700.

Specifications

See also

References 

High-bypass turbofan engines
Trent 7000
2010s turbofan engines